Abontjeman is an abandoned settlement in Brokopondo District, Suriname. It was located along the Sara Creek, and used to be inhabited by maroons. The village was flooded in 1964 after the construction of the Afobaka Dam.

Abontjeman used to have a train station on the Lawa Railway. Fairweather's company ceased to exist in 1943.

References

Former populated places in Suriname